Douglas Howard Gresham (born November 10, 1945) is an American British stage and voice-over actor, biographer, film producer, and executive record producer. He is one of the two stepsons of C. S. Lewis.

Early life 
Gresham was born in New York City, the son of writers William Lindsay Gresham and Joy Davidman. William Gresham was the author of Nightmare Alley, the classic of American noir literature, while Joy Davidman was best known for her book Smoke on the Mountain, about the Ten Commandments. The couple were separated in 1954, and Joy moved to England with her two sons. His mother was of Jewish descent.

C. S. Lewis 
Gresham's mother had become friends with C. S. Lewis through correspondence, and the friendship blossomed, eventually leading to marriage in 1956. Gresham's mother died of cancer in 1960, and Lewis continued to raise Douglas and his elder brother David. (Lewis had adopted the boys when he married, and The Horse and His Boy is dedicated to them both.) At Lewis's death in 1963, his estate went to his brother Major Warren Hamilton Lewis. The Major in turn passed the estate to Douglas and David ten years later. 

Douglas Gresham is a Christian, as were Lewis and his mother, while David returned to the Orthodox Judaism of their mother's ancestors while still a child in Lewis's home. Lewis made an effort to find kosher food for him.

Career 
Gresham hosted Focus on the Family Radio Theatre's adaptations of his stepfather's most famous works, and his interest in media versions thereof was later shown again when he was named co-producer for the series of theatrical films adaptations of The Chronicles of Narnia; he also made a cameo in the first installment as a radio newscaster, the second as a "Telmarine crier" and the third as a slaver.

Gresham came on as executive producer of recording artist Meg Sutherland's debut album in 2014, successfully signing her to Sprig Music in March with producer Christopher Hopper. He has responded to Sutherland's music by saying that it "sings from and about the heart. Sometimes it hurts. Sometimes it fills with joy. But then, beauty is like that.”

Personal life 
Douglas Gresham and his wife, Merrie, lived at Rathvinden House in Leighlinbridge, County Carlow, Ireland, before moving to their house in Malta in 2008.  They have five children: three sons, James, Timothy, and Dominick, and two daughters, Lucinda, and Melodie. Prior to this he owned four farms in Tasmania, Australia, with his wife Merrie and their four children.

Gresham has written an autobiography, Lenten Lands, of his life to the age of 28 in 1973. A fictionalized young Douglas Gresham is a character in the 1993 film Shadowlands, in part derived from Lenten Lands. In the film, Gresham is played by the American actor Joseph Mazzello. There is no character derived from Douglas' brother David in the film or in the stage play on which the film was based, although both Douglas and David were portrayed in the original teleplay (1985) on which the stage play was based.

Douglas Gresham acknowledged in a 15 November 2005 interview on NPR that he and his brother, David, had been estranged, although in a 4 December 2005 interview he did say that they had been in email contact. After David's death Gresham revealed that his brother had been diagnosed as paranoid schizophrenic, and had often tried to harm him. David died in a Swiss mental hospital.

Bibliography 
 Lenten Lands: My Childhood with Joy Davidman and C.S. Lewis, Macmillan (USA 1988) 
 Jack's Life:The Life Story of C.S. Lewis, Broadman and Holman (2005)

References

Sibley, Brian (1985). C. S. Lewis: Through the Shadowlands, Fleming H. Revell,

External links 

 More to Doug Gresham than Narnia
 
 "In Lenten Lands", Le Penseur Réfléchit, the Mr. Renaissance bi-weekly newsletter, 2001–2002 archive
 Interview with Douglas Gresham
 

1945 births
Living people
C. S. Lewis
British biographers
British film producers
20th-century biographers
British Christians
British people of American descent
British people of Polish-Jewish descent
British people of Ukrainian-Jewish descent